Micah Kilakila Kaaihue (born March 29, 1984) is an American former professional baseball player. He played in Major League Baseball (MLB) for the Kansas City Royals and Oakland Athletics and in Nippon Professional Baseball (NPB) for the Hiroshima Toyo Carp. Kaaihue went to Iolani School in Honolulu, Hawaii.

Professional career

Kansas City Royals
The Kansas City Royals in the 15th round, with the 438th overall selection, of the 2002 Major League Baseball draft. In , he played for the Double-A Wichita Wranglers.

Kaaihue split  between the Single-A Advanced Wilmington Blue Rocks and Wichita. In , Kaaihue played for Kansas City's new Double-A affiliate, the Northwest Arkansas Naturals.  There, he led the minor leagues in walks, with 104. He also played for the Triple-A Omaha Royals.

When rosters expanded on September 1, 2008, Kaaihue was called up to the major leagues. He made his major league debut on September 4, . He hit his first major league home run on September 20, 2008.

Kaaihue spent the entire 2009 season in Omaha.  He began the 2010 season in Omaha, and was called up to Kansas City in May. In his first Major League at bat that season, he pinch hit for Willie Bloomquist in the 8th inning of a May 6 game against the Texas Rangers, and hit an RBI single that broke an 11-11 tie. After having a disappointing start of the season Kila started getting hot finishing the 2010 Royals season with 8 home runs and 25 runs batted in.

Kaaihue started the 2011 season as the regular first baseman for the Kansas City Royals. He hit a walk-off home run on April 1 as the Royals beat the Angels 2-1. Mired in a hitting slump from the start of the season, averaging just .195 in 23 games, with only six RBIs and two homers, Kaaihue was optioned to Triple-A Omaha on May 5. Eric Hosmer was called up to replace him. He was designated for assignment on September 21, 2011.

Oakland Athletics

On September 27, 2011, the Royals traded Kaʻaihue to the Oakland Athletics for minor league pitcher Ethan Hollingsworth. On June 6, 2012, the Athletics designated him for assignment. In 39 games for the Athletics, he hit .234/.295/.398 with 4 HR and 14 RBI.

Arizona Diamondbacks
On November 21, 2012, Kaaihue signed a minor league contract with the Arizona Diamondbacks, but was released from the Reno Aces, Arizona's Triple-A affiliate, on June 1, 2013. He led the Triple-A Pacific Coast League in home runs.

Hiroshima Toyo Carp
On June 15, 2013, Kaaihue signed with the Hiroshima Toyo Carp in Japan.

Washington Nationals
On January 18, 2015, he signed a minor league contract with the Washington Nationals. He was released on May 24 after hitting just .194 in the minors.

Miami Marlins
On June 22, 2015, he signed a minor league deal with the Miami Marlins.

Coaching career
In July 2016 Ka'aihue accepted the head coaching job at Henry J. Kaiser High School. Upon the completion of his degree in accounting in 2020, Kaaihue joined the coaching staff at Hawaii as a volunteer assistant.

Personal
Kaaihue's younger brother, Kala Ka'aihue, is a minor league baseball first baseman. He is of Hawaiian descent.

References

External links

1984 births
Living people
Baseball coaches from Hawaii
American expatriate baseball players in Japan
Baseball players from Hawaii
Burlington Bees players
Gulf Coast Royals players
Hawaii Rainbow Warriors baseball coaches
High Desert Mavericks players
High school baseball coaches in the United States
Hiroshima Toyo Carp players
Kansas City Royals players
Leones del Escogido players
American expatriate baseball players in the Dominican Republic
Major League Baseball first basemen
New Orleans Zephyrs players
Nippon Professional Baseball first basemen
Northwest Arkansas Naturals players
Oakland Athletics players
Omaha Royals players
Omaha Storm Chasers players
Reno Aces players
Sacramento River Cats players
Surprise Rafters players
Syracuse Chiefs players
Wichita Wranglers players
Wilmington Blue Rocks players
Native Hawaiian sportspeople